An independence day is an annual event commemorating the anniversary of a nation's independence or statehood, usually after ceasing to be a group or part of another nation or state, or more rarely after the end of a military occupation. Many countries commemorate their independence from a colonial empire.

Not all countries mark independence as a national holiday. Many, such as Australia, Canada, Denmark, New Zealand, Ireland, Luxembourg, Saudi Arabia, South Africa, Taiwan, and Turkey mark other dates of significance.

List 
The following is a list of independence days of countries around the world:

See also
 Decolonization
 Political history of the world
 Timeline of national independence
 List of countries that gained independence from Spain

References

External links

Essay on Indian Independence Day

Independence days
Independence Day
Sovereignty
Lists of observances
national independence days